When the Wrong One Loves You Right is the third studio album by American country music artist Wade Hayes. Released in January 1998 as his final album for Columbia Records Nashville, it includes the singles "The Day That She Left Tulsa (In a Chevy)" and "How Do You Sleep at Night", which peaked at #5 and #13, respectively, on the Billboard Hot Country Singles & Tracks (now Hot Country Songs) charts. Also released were the title track and "Tore Up from the Floor Up", neither of which reached Top 40.

The album was originally to have been released in 1997 under the title Tore Up from the Floor Up, with a cover of Glen Campbell's "Wichita Lineman" serving as the lead-off single. After this cover failed to reach Top 40, however, it was replaced with "The Day That She Left Tulsa" and the album was re-titled, with "Wichita Lineman" not making the album's final cut.

The track "Summer Was a Bummer" was previously cut by Ty Herndon on his 1995 debut album What Mattered Most.

Track listing

Personnel 
As listed in liner notes.
Bruce Bouton – pedal steel guitar, lap steel guitar
Mark Casstevens – acoustic guitar
Larry Franklin – fiddle, mandolin
Wade Hayes – lead vocals, background vocals, electric guitar
John Barlow Jarvis – piano, keyboards, Hammond organ
Liana Manis – background vocals
Brent Mason – electric guitar, gut-string guitar, 6-string bass guitar
Joey Miskulin – accordion
Michael Rhodes – bass guitar
John Wesley Ryles – background vocals
Dennis Wilson – background vocals
Lonnie Wilson – drums, percussion
Glenn Worf – bass guitar

Chart performance

References

External links 
Allmusic (see infobox)
Liner notes to When the Wrong One Loves You Right. Columbia Records, 1998.

1998 albums
Columbia Records albums
Wade Hayes albums
Albums produced by Don Cook